Konstantin Viktorovich Yeryomenko, often transliterated as Eremenko (Russian: Константин Викторович Ерёменко; 5 August 1970 – 18 March 2010) was a Russian futsal player who was named the greatest futsal player of the 20th century.

Career 
Yeryomenko played 11-a-side football in his youth, but began to play futsal in 1990. He played for Dina Moscow for 10 years, during which time he also became the all-time top scorer of the Russian national team. He became a key player in Russia's 1999 UEFA Futsal Championship triumph, scoring the winning penalty in a shoot-out against hosts Spain. He was recognised by many as the greatest Russian futsal player of all time and throughout the futsal community as one of the game's legends.

After retiring from futsal in 2001, Yeryomenko went on to become president of Dinamo Moscow in 2002 and in 2003, he was elected as the first president of the Russian Futsal Super League.

In 2004, Yeryomenko became a member of the Federation Council of Russia.

Death 

Konstantin Yeryomenko died from a heart attack while playing in a kickabout match. Despite having a history of heart problems, which were instrumental in his decision to retire from futsal and also necessitated surgery at the height of his playing career, he chose to defy doctors' orders and continued to play. He is buried in Moscow's Troyekurovskoye Cemetery.

Honours

Club 
 CIS Futsal League: 1992
 Russian Futsal Super League (8): 1992/93, 1993/94, 1994/95, 1995/96, 1996/97, 1997/98, 1998/99, 1999/00
 USSR Futsal Cup: 1990
 Russian Futsal Cup (7): 1992, 1993, 1995, 1996, 1997, 1998, 1999
 UEFA Futsal Champions League (3): 1995, 1997, 1999
 Intercontinental Futsal Cup: 1997
 Legends Cup: 2009

International 
 FIFA Futsal World Championship third place: 1996
 UEFA Futsal Championship winner: 1999
 UEFA Futsal Championship runner-up: 1996
 UEFA Futsal Championship third place: 2001

Individual 
 Best Russian futsal player (7): 1992–1998
 1132 goals scored in official games
 Dina Moscow all-time top scorer (972)
 Russian national team all-time top scorer (122)
 Russian Futsal Super League all-time top scorer (533)
 Russian Futsal Cup all-time top scorer (210)
 Russian Top League Cup all-time top scorer (46)
 UEFA Futsal Champions League and Intercontinental Futsal Cup all-time top scorer (61)
 FIFA Futsal World Championship Silver Shoe: 1992
 UEFA Futsal Championship Golden Shoe: 1996, 1999
 UEFA Futsal Championship Best Player: 1999

References

External links 
 MFK Dinamo-Yamal squad 
 

1970 births
2010 deaths
Russian men's futsal players
Ukrainian emigrants to Russia
Soviet footballers
Soviet Top League players
Burials in Troyekurovskoye Cemetery
FC Dnipro players
FC Alga Bishkek players
FC Irtysh Pavlodar players
Association football players who died while playing
Footballers from Dnipro
Sport deaths in Russia
Association football midfielders
Members of the Federation Council of Russia (after 2000)